N26 (known as Number 26 until July 2016) is a German neobank headquartered in Berlin, Germany. N26 was founded in 2013 in a Rocket Internet Incubator and currently operates in various member states of the Single Euro Payments Area (SEPA). It provides a free basic current account and a debit card, with overdraft and investment products and premium accounts available for a monthly fee.

History 

The company was founded as a financial technology startup in 2013 by Valentin Stalf and Maximilian Tayenthal. According to Stalf, the name is derived from number of smaller cubes in a complete Rubik's Cube, since a 3x3x3 cube has 26 individual visible cubes (27 less 1 hidden). In April 2015, N26 received €10 million in a series A round by Valar Ventures.

Initially, Number 26 started operations without holding a banking license; instead, it was provided an interface to a back end provided by Wirecard. In July 2016, it re-branded as N26 Bank, having received its own banking license from BaFin.

In June 2016 N26 notified several customers that their accounts were going to be terminated. The company cited as main reasons that some customers were making too many ATM withdrawals, while others were suspected of money laundering.

In November 2016, customers were asked to transfer their accounts to N26 Bank's infrastructure. As a result, they would have to get a new account IBAN number and accounts held by Wirecard would be terminated. During the transfer of its customer base to its own banking infrastructure, N26 customers reported various problems.

In December 2016, N26 announced that its basic current account would be available to 17 Eurozone countries.

In March 2018, N26 raised $160 million in a series C round by Chinese internet giant Tencent Holdings and Allianz X (Allianz). On the same date, N26 claimed to have a customer base of 850,000, aiming to have 5,000,000 customers by 2020.

In January 2019, N26 raised an additional $300 million in a series D round led by Insight Venture Partners with Singapore's sovereign wealth fund GIC and a few existing investors also participating at a valuation of $2.7 billion. With its new valuation of $2.7 billion, N26 overtook Revolut as the most valuable mobile bank in Europe.

On 11 July 2019, N26 soft launched in the United States, initially allowing customers to sign up for a waiting list. Due to differences in the U.S. market (particularly in regards to regulatory schemes for financial providers), N26 partnered with Axos Bank to serve as the provider of its services, insured under FDIC. Unlike in Europe, where they are provided by MasterCard, N26 used Visa cards for U.S. customers. The following week, the company extended its series D round with an additional $170 million investment, valuing the company at $3.5 billion. In May 2020, the company announced the extension of its recent Series D round with an additional $100M raised at the same valuation.

On 11 February 2020, N26 announced that it would cease doing business in the United Kingdom and close all accounts effective 15 April, due to the UK withdrawal from the European Union. The company cited the fact that European financial institutions can no longer operate in the region without applying for a banking license in the UK (rather than being allowed to operate under its EU license), as well as "the timings and framework outlined in the EU Withdrawal Agreement".

In November and December 2020, the subsidiaries N26 GmbH and N26 Operations GmbH elected works councils representing the employees of the Berlin offices.

In January 2021, N26 announced the upcoming appointment of former ProSiebenSat.1 and Zalando executive Jan Kemper as the company’s Chief Financial Officer. In January 2022, the bank announced that Kemper will also be taking over the role of Chief Operating Officer in addition to his role as CFO. 

In October 2021, N26 raised $900 million in a Series E round led by Third Point Ventures and Coatue Management, and joined by Dragoneer Investment Group as well as existing N26 investors. The funding round valued the digital bank at $9 billion.

In November 2021, N26 announced that it would be pulling out of the United States in January 2022, leading to the closure of approximately 500,000 accounts. American customers were no longer be able to use its app after January 11, 2022. The withdrawal was to focus on N26's core European business.

In November 2022, N26 changed its legal form from a German Limited Liability Company (Gesellschaft mit beschränkter Haftung – GmbH) to a German Stock Corporation (Aktiengesellschaft – AG). At the same time, a five-member board of directors was appointed, chaired by Marcus W. Mosen. Other members are Jörg Gerbig, Dr. Barbara Roth, Dr. Julian Deutz and Dr. Robert Killian.

According to N26, it employs more than 1,500 people at its locations in Amsterdam, Berlin, Barcelona, Belgrade, Madrid, Milan, Paris, Vienna, New York, Barcelona, and São Paulo.

Product overview 

N26 provides a free basic current account and a Debit MasterCard card to all its customers, as well as a Maestro card for their customers in certain markets. Additionally, customers can request overdraft and investment products. N26 also offers premium accounts (N26 Smart, N26 You and N26 Metal) which offer additional features for a monthly fee.

The account opening process can be completed via a video chat with N26's identity verification partner, IDnow. Only holders of certain passports and ID cards can verify their identity online; others will have to visit a German post office if it is supported by Postident.

Availability 
N26 offers its services in 24 European countries. In Austria, Germany and the Netherlands customers can additionally request a Maestro card.

N26 closed its business in April 2020 in the UK. In November 2021, they also announced that they would pull out of the American market from January 2022 closing all (approx.) 500,000 accounts there

Some parts of the website and customer service are provided in English, German, French, Italian and Spanish regardless of the customer's residency.

Mobile payments 

N26 customers in several of its markets can use their smartphone for in-store purchases. N26 supports Google Pay in Austria, Belgium, Denmark, Estonia, Finland, France, Germany, Greece, Ireland, Italy, Latvia, Lithuania, Netherlands, Norway, Poland, Portugal, Slovakia, Spain, Switzerland and Sweden, while it supports Apple Pay in Germany, Austria, France, Italy, Spain, Finland, Ireland, Iceland, Greece, Liechtenstein, Luxembourg, Portugal, Slovakia, Estonia, Belgium, Poland, Norway, Netherlands, Slovenia, Sweden, Denmark, Switzerland. Additional countries are added as both Google Pay and Apple Pay gradually expand throughout N26's markets.

Fees 
N26 has a basic account with no monthly fee and charges no fees for basic banking transactions or credit card payments in foreign currencies. In the Eurozone (except Austria and Italy) ATM withdrawals are limited to five per month for primary account holders and three per month for others. N26 charges a €2 fee for any additional withdrawal.

ATM withdrawals in foreign currencies are also subject to a 1.70% fee for basic accounts and are free for N26 You and Metal account holders.

German customers can also withdraw and deposit money at retail locations. While there is no fee for withdrawals up to €999, deposits are subject to a 1.5% fee.

Security 

Customers can lock and unlock their MasterCard through the mobile app without having to contact N26 support. They can also enable and disable it for usage abroad or online usage and modify the daily limits for cash withdrawals and card payments. Funds held in N26 accounts are also covered by all the requisite statutory requirements of a licensed bank, and are protected up to 100,000€ under the German Deposit Protection scheme.

Mobile transfers 

The N26 app can scan the users' contacts in their smartphones and identify other N26 account holders. Using a service called Moneybeam an N26 customer can send funds to these contacts without having to fill in their IBAN. Moneybeam transfers are executed instantaneously at no cost.

Controversies

Anti-Money laundering compliance issues 

Following an inquiry made by several German medias reporting that it was possible to quickly open an N26 account with fake identity documents, the bank is in German financial regulatory authority BaFin's sight since 2018.

In May 2021, BaFin demanded that N26 take actions to prevent money laundering and terrorism financing. And in June 2021, the bank was fined 4.25 million euros by BaFin for weaknesses in its anti-money laundering system. At least 50 transactions were suspicious and occurred between 2019 and 2020. The bank was too slow to report them to BaFin which prevented an efficient inquiry.
BaFin also installed a supervisor in the bank.

Security incidents 

In December 2016, Vincent Haupert, a research fellow in computer science from the University of Erlangen-Nuremberg, demonstrated how he could take advantage of security vulnerabilities in order to get access to N26 users' accounts.
Haupert had already notified N26 of the vulnerabilities back in September 2016.
N26 acknowledged the issues and claimed that they had been fixed before they became public, adding that no user account had actually been compromised.

In March 2019, German media reported that customers who had their account credentials stolen found it difficult to contact the bank and resolve the situation. Customer advocates reported that there was a growing number of complaints from phishing victims who were unable to access their accounts and found it difficult to contact the bank. In a widely reported case N26 took more than two weeks to restore access for a customer who had €80,000 stolen from his account. The reports raised the question if the rapid growth of the bank had left it ill-equipped to deal with the increasing number of support cases.

Works council

In August 2020, N26 management drew public criticism for opposing the election of works councils for its Berlin-based subsidiaries N26 GmbH and N26 Operations GmbH. After employees announced a company-wide meeting to form an election committee, N26 obtained a temporary injunction to postpone the works council election, arguing that the hygiene concept did not meet the legal requirements.

To protect the named employees from further legal action, the trade union Ver.di stepped in to host the meeting at an outside venue. After N26 filed another injunction targeting Ver.di, IG Metall, another trade union organizing workers in the tech sector, called for the meeting instead.

On the day of the meeting, the police were called to the location but found no violations of the current safety measures, allowing the selection of an election committee to go forward. An N26 spokesperson said that they had no knowledge of anyone at the company calling the police on workers. 

After the works councils were established, CEO Valentin Stalf apologized in a blog post, stating that N26 supports the right of employees to formal representation.

In May 2022, the employees elected a works council for the second time. According to a media report, members of the works council subsequently drew a positive balance.

See also 
 Boursorama
 bunq
 Klarna
 Revolut
 Wise

References

External links 
 
 

Banks of Germany
Financial technology companies
Mobile payments
Online payments
Payment systems
Payment service providers
Companies based in Berlin